The American Boy's Handy Book is a handbook of activities intended for boys, written by a founder of the Boy Scouts of America, Daniel Carter Beard. It is divided into seasonal sections, with activities appropriate for each season in their respective sections. Originally published in New York City in 1882 with 254 black-and-white figures and 63 illustrations. The 2010 Centennial Edition of the book was granted the Gelett Burgess Children's Book Award in the Sports and Hobbies category.

Background
This book for American boys in the late 19th century is filled with black & white illustrations and schematics. It gives instruction and advice on subjects ranging from kites, fishing, knots, telescopes, tents, soap bubbles, snowball warfare, puppets, kaleidoscopes, whirligigs, costumes, decoys and fireworks. There are many topics related to animals and wildlife--even including taxidermy and trapping. The projects range in complexity. From the very simple (like paper crafts), to the quite involved--such as boat construction.

Further reading
 Beard, Daniel Carter [1890] (1995). The American Boy's Handy Book. Originally published: New York, Scribner. This edition: Lincoln, Massachusetts, David Godine.

See also

Boy Scout Handbook

References

External links
 The American Boy's Handy Book at inquiry.net
 The American Boy's Handy Book 1920 edition at archive.org

Literature of the Boy Scouts of America
Children's non-fiction books
1890 non-fiction books
1890s children's books
American children's books